Craig Frost (born April 20, 1948 in Flint, Michigan) is the keyboardist for Bob Seger & the Silver Bullet Band. He is also known as keyboardist for 1970s hard rock band Grand Funk Railroad. He plays organ, synthesizers, and piano.

Frost expanded Grand Funk's "power trio" musical style, by adding another dimension to their music. Grand Funk scored its biggest hits after Frost joined the band in 1972, and his work is instantly recognizable on Grand Funk's #1 songs "The Loco-Motion" (a cover of Little Eva's hit) and "We're an American Band". He also contributed significantly to Grand Funk as a songwriter, in partnership with drummer Don Brewer.

After the initial breakup of Grand Funk Railroad in 1977, Frost joined with former Grand Funk bandmates Don Brewer and bassist Mel Schacher to form the short-lived band 'Flint'. After the demise of Flint, Frost joined Bob Seger & the Silver Bullet Band, where he has remained for over two decades. In July 2005, Frost "sat in" at a concert in North Branch, Michigan, for the first time since 1977 with Grand Funk. He has done so a number of times since, at such locations as Detroit and Las Vegas.

References

1948 births
Living people
American rock pianists
American organists 
American rock keyboardists
Bob Seger & the Silver Bullet Band members
Grand Funk Railroad members
Musicians from Flint, Michigan
20th-century American keyboardists